The Lord Howe Island butterflyfish (Amphichaetodon howensis) is a butterflyfish of the family Chaetodontidae, found along the east coast of Australia, around Lord Howe Island, and down the east coast of Northland in New Zealand, at depths of between 10 and 150 m.  They are up to 20 cm long with black and yellow/white vertical stripes.

References 

 
 Tony Ayling & Geoffrey Cox, Collins Guide to the Sea Fishes of New Zealand,  (William Collins Publishers Ltd, Auckland, New Zealand 1982) 
 Images of Amphichaetodon howensis (Waite, 1903) in the collection of the Museum of New Zealand Te Papa Tongarewa

Lord Howe Island butterflyfish
Fish of Lord Howe Island
Lord Howe Island butterflyfish